Sir Percy Ernest Joske, CMG QC (5 October 1895 – 25 April 1981) was an Australian lawyer, politician and judge. He was a member of the House of Representatives from 1951 to 1960, representing the Liberal Party. He subsequently served on the Commonwealth Industrial Court from 1960 to 1977, as well as on the supreme courts of the Australian Capital Territory and Northern Territory. He was a prolific author of legal textbooks.

Early life
Joske was born on 5 October 1895 in Albert Park, Victoria. He was the youngest of three children born to Evalyne (née Richards) and Ernest Joske. His mother died in childbirth and his father, a German-born solicitor, remarried in 1898.

Joske attended Wesley College, Melbourne, where he was classmates with future prime minister Robert Menzies. He went on to study arts and law at the University of Melbourne, graduating Bachelor of Laws (1915), Master of Laws (1918), Bachelor of Arts (1921) and Master of Arts (1923). He was admitted to the Victorian Bar in 1917.

Legal career
Joske's legal practice specialised in divorce law. Appointed King's Counsel in 1944, he was the editor of the Victorian Law Reports from 1936 to 1956, lectured part-time at the University of Melbourne and wrote several legal textbooks. His obituary in The Canberra Times stated that he was "probably best known as the author of Law and Procedure at Meetings" (1938). His other works included The Remuneration of Commission Agents (1924), The Law of Marriage and Divorce (1925), The Law and Principles of Insurance in Australasia (1933), and Sale of Goods in Australia (1949). Joske inherited from his father an association with the dentistry profession, succeeding him as registrar of the Dental Board of Victoria in 1940 and giving lectures in dentistry case law at the Australian College of Dentistry.

Politics
In 1951, he was elected to the Australian House of Representatives as the Liberal member for the blue-ribbon seat of Balaclava, being elected in the by-election following the resignation of Thomas White. Joske resigned in 1960 to become Judge of the Commonwealth Industrial Court. He was subsequently appointed to the Supreme Court of the Australian Capital Territory (1960–77) and the Supreme Court of the Northern Territory (1961–77). He was knighted in 1967, and died in 1981.
He was also an author, and published a biography of Sir Robert Menzies a year before his death,.

Personal life
In 1928, Joske married Mavis Connell, a music teacher; their only child Thomas Joske became a judge of the Federal Court of Australia. He was widowed in 1968 and remarried in 1969 to Hilda Larcombe, a cousin of his first wife. After their marriage he moved to Melbourne to Sydney, settling in her Georgian-revival mansion "Somerset" in the suburb of Strathfield, which was later acquired by Trinity Grammar School.

Outside of his parliamentary and judicial careers, Joske served as president of the Royal Life Saving Society Australia from 1951 to 1979. He was appointed Commander of the Order of St Michael and St George (CMG) in 1967 and created Knight Bachelor in 1977. In retirement he published a memoir of Robert Menzies titled Sir Robert Menzies 1894-1978: A New, Informal Memoir. He died in Strathfield on 25 April 1981, aged 85.

References

Liberal Party of Australia members of the Parliament of Australia
Members of the Australian House of Representatives for Balaclava
Members of the Australian House of Representatives
Australian Companions of the Order of St Michael and St George
1895 births
1981 deaths
Australian Knights Bachelor
Judges of the Supreme Court of the Australian Capital Territory
Judges of the Supreme Court of the Northern Territory
Judges from Melbourne
20th-century Australian politicians
Judges of the Commonwealth Industrial Court
20th-century Australian judges
Judges of the Supreme Court of Norfolk Island
People from Albert Park, Victoria
Writers from Melbourne
Australian people of German descent
Australian textbook writers
Australian King's Counsel